The SunU-Monash BRT station is located in Bandar Sunway, Subang Jaya, Selangor and is served by the BRT Sunway Line.

The station is located besides the Monash University Malaysia Campus and nearby Sunway University; both universities which this station is named after and serves. The station is also adjacent to SunMed BRT station which is on the same road.
The station is also located beside the BRT depot, and has a multi-storey parking lot.
Like other BRT stations on the line, this BRT station is elevated.

Gallery

References 

Bus rapid transit in Malaysia
Buildings and structures in Selangor
2015 establishments in Malaysia